Back in the Day is a 2005 crime drama starring Ja Rule and Ving Rhames and directed by James Hunter. The film premiered on BET on May 13, 2005.

Plot
Reggie Cooper is a young man who lives with his father in order to avoid the violent gang activity that almost claimed his life when he was a teenager. However, when his recently paroled mentor, J-Bone reconnects with Reggie, and when his father is murdered, Reggie slips back into a life of crime. Reggie murders a local preacher, whose daughter later develops a relationship with him.

Cast
 Ja Rule as Reggie Cooper 
 Ving Rhames as Joseph "J-Bone" Brown
 Tatyana Ali as Alicia Packer
 Giancarlo Esposito as Benson Cooper
 Joe Morton as Reverend James Packer
 Pam Grier as Mrs. Cooper
 Frank Langella as Lieutenant Bill Hudson
Lahmard Tate as Jamal
 Tia Carrere as Loot
 Al Sapienza as Detective Kline
 Davetta Sherwood as Tasha
 Kaly Cordova as Police Officer

Production and reception 
In early 2003 Ja Rule announced that he was to act in a film alongside Ving Rhames. Filming was slated to take place in Puerto Rico during September of the same year. The film was written by James Hunter and Michael Raffanello, directed by Hunter, and scored by composer Robert Folk. The film was primarily produced by DEJ Productions, at the time its most expensive to date, with budget estimates of $5 to $10 million to over $10 million. Filming ended in 2004, and by April DEJ was preparing a potential theatrical release. Back in the Day premiered on BET on May 13, 2005, and was released to DVD on May 24.

Reviewer Ed Huls called it conceptually similar to several other urban crime dramas, but noted the cast and production values made it a high-end release in the genre, and compared it to classic gangster films: "one could easily picture Cagney or Bogart in the Rhames role."

David Kronke of the Los Angeles Daily News wrote: "No original gangstas in this movie, but plenty of unoriginal ones... How did such a ridiculous script lure so many talented actors?"

See also 
 List of hood films

References

External links 
 
 
 

2005 films
American crime drama films
2005 crime drama films
Hood films
Films scored by Robert Folk
2000s English-language films
2000s American films